Feeding the Beast is a 2011 album by Danish band Surfact. It was released in October 2011 in Denmark reaching #11 on the Danish Albums Chart in its first week of release.

Track list
The Pace
Feeding The Beast
Before My Eyes
No Real You
Atmosphere
Higher Ground
The Step
Heartbeat
Taking You Over
Leave And Survive
Reset
When I Return

References 

2011 albums